Charles Sibanda (born 30 March 1985) is a Zimbabwean professional footballer, who plays as a forward for Bulawayo Chiefs and the Zimbabwe national team.

Career

Club
Hwange were Sibanda's first club, he stayed with the club for one year before departing to join Motor Action. With Motor Action, Sibanda won the 2010 Zimbabwe Premier Soccer League title and subsequently won the 2010 Soccer Star of the Year award. Platinum became his third club in 2011 when he agreed to join the Zvishavane-based club, he remained there for three years. Moves to Highlanders and How Mine have since followed. In 2015, Sibanda was involved in a serious car accident, he sustained injuries to his right shoulder, his right collar bone and one of his lungs. He has since made a full recovery.

International
In January 2014, coach Ian Gorowa, invited him to be a part of the Zimbabwe squad for the 2014 African Nations Championship. He helped the team to a fourth-place finish after being defeated by Nigeria by a goal to nil. Overall, Sibanda has played 11 times and scored 2 goals for Zimbabwe.

Career statistics

International
.

International goals
. Scores and results list Zimbabwe's goal tally first.

Honours

Club
Motor Action
Zimbabwe Premier Soccer League (1): 2010

Platinum
 Zimbabwean Independence Trophy (2): 2012, 2014
 Cup of Zimbabwe (1): 2014

Individual
 Soccer Star of the Year (1): 2010

References

Living people
Zimbabwean footballers
Zimbabwe A' international footballers
2014 African Nations Championship players
1985 births
Hwange Colliery F.C. players
Motor Action F.C. players
F.C. Platinum players
Highlanders F.C. players
How Mine F.C. players
Bulawayo Chiefs F.C. players
Association football forwards
Zimbabwe international footballers
2011 African Nations Championship players